Tmesisternus humeralis is a species of beetle in the family Cerambycidae. It was described by Per Olof Christopher Aurivillius in 1923. It is known from Papua New Guinea.

References

humeralis
Beetles described in 1923